Nepako is a Finnish company that produce "open innovation" social networks in order to help people to share, review and develop business ideas. In June 2010, the company announced that it will open an innovative network in Malta for the Q3 2010.

The innovation social network, which also includes an online marketplace, introduces online collaborative technologies and focuses on helping businessmen get in touch with other like-minded people creating business growth opportunities.

The 01.10.2010, the Malta's Parliament Secretary Jason Azzorpardi opened in an Open-Innovation seminar the kupoma platform  to the public.

Transfer 

Nepako Corporation is not anymore managing the kupoma social network for innovators, students and entrepreneurs.

From the begin of July 2011, the activities are transferred to the kupoma Group, a separate operating management buy-out of social networking operations of Nepako.

See also
Business network
Reputation systems
Social network
List of social networking websites

References

External links
 Nepako's website

Finnish social networking websites
Internet properties established in 2010
Social networking services
Finnish companies established in 2010